The Enemy is a first person narrative espionage thriller novel by English author Desmond Bagley, first published in 1977. In 2001 it was made into a movie starring Roger Moore, Luke Perry and Olivia d'Abo.

Plot
Malcolm Jaggard calls himself an economist, but is really working undercover for British Intelligence. He is engaged to geneticist Dr Penelope Ashton and was spending a weekend at her parents’ home when her sister was viciously attacked by a stranger who threw acid on her face. Jaggard uses his position to investigate the Ashtons and finds to his surprise that the identity of her father, George Ashton, is classified to the highest levels. He is also surprised when his superiors order him to guard the Ashtons against further attacks at all costs, without revealing his own true identity even to Penelope Ashton.

References

External links
Crime Time review of Desmond Bagley
Fantastic Fiction site with publication history
Internet Movie Database

1977 British novels
British spy novels
Novels by Desmond Bagley
Novels set in Sweden
Novels set in Scotland
British novels adapted into films
William Collins, Sons books